Neil William Niles (born 24 March 1971) is a former British Virgin Islands cricketer. Niles was a right-handed batsman who bowled right-arm medium-fast.

In 2008, the British Virgin Islands were invited to take part in the 2008 Stanford 20/20, whose matches held official Twenty20 status. Niles made a single appearance in the tournament against Dominica in a preliminary round defeat, with Niles being run out for a single run by the combination of substitute fielder Gary Daniel and Samuel Mitchell.

References

External links
Neil Niles at ESPNcricinfo
Neil Niles at CricketArchive

1971 births
Living people
British Virgin Islands cricketers